The Big Stone Gap Shale is a geologic formation in Virginia. It preserves fossils dating back to the Carboniferous period.

See also

 List of fossiliferous stratigraphic units in Virginia
 Paleontology in Virginia

References
 

Carboniferous geology of Virginia